Adrian Nikçi (born 10 November 1989) is a former professional footballer who played as midfielder. Born in Bosnia and Herzegovina, Nikçi represented Switzerland internationally.

Club career
Nikçi previously played with FC Zürich in the Swiss Super League.

At the end of the 2016–17 season, he was released by Union Berlin.

International career
While Nikçi represented Switzerland at U19 and U21 levels, he expressed his interest in playing for Albania and manifested this also in celebrating a goal by making the sign of the eagle with his two hands, the eagle being the symbol of the Albanian flag.

References

External links
 

1989 births
Living people
Footballers from Sarajevo
Bosnia and Herzegovina people of Albanian descent
Bosnia and Herzegovina emigrants to Switzerland
Swiss people of Albanian descent
Association football midfielders
Swiss men's footballers
Switzerland under-21 international footballers
FC Zürich players
Hannover 96 players
FC Thun players
BSC Young Boys players
1. FC Nürnberg players
1. FC Union Berlin players
FC Schaffhausen players
Swiss Super League players
Swiss Challenge League players
Bundesliga players
2. Bundesliga players
Swiss expatriate footballers
Swiss expatriate sportspeople in Germany
Expatriate footballers in Germany